On 5 October 2022 at 8 PM (IST), on the day of Vijaya Dashami, suddenly a flood came in the Mal river in Malbazar, West Bengal, India during the immersion during Durga Puja.

Background
On 5 October 2022 at 8 PM (IST), suddenly a flood came in the Mal river in Malbazar, West Bengal, India during the immersion during Durga Puja. Following which, 8 people were died and many people injured. Also, some of the people went missing after the accident.

Aftermath
Following the accident, Prime Minister Narendra Modi and Chief Minister Mamata Banerjee expressed condolences on the death of people and announced the ex-gratia of Rs. 2 lakh to the family of the people who died.

References 

2022 in India
Floods in India